Robert Sinclair (born 9 April 1974) is a former professional footballer who played in The Football League for Maidstone United.

References

English footballers
Maidstone United F.C. (1897) players
Dagenham & Redbridge F.C. players
English Football League players
1974 births
Living people
Association football forwards